Highland School of Technology is a magnet public high school located in Gastonia, North Carolina. It is the first magnet school available to students in the Gaston County Schools public school district and draws students from each of the other nine high schools in the district. The percentage of students at Highland from a particular feeder high school is equal to the overall percentage of that school's students in the district. Students are selected through a lottery among qualified 8th-grade applicants.

The school opened to freshmen and sophomores in the 2000 school year. The first graduating class was in 2003.

Highland School of Technology has had four principals:
David Baldaia, who was the school's inaugural principal, but he left without serving a year to start Phillip O. Berry Academy of Technology in Charlotte-Mecklenburg Schools system.

Lee Dedmon UNC Center "6 foot 11 and 3/4"  became the principal in 2001 and remained at the helm until July 1, 2013 when he retired and was succeeded by Denise McLean as principal of Highland.
McLean had at one time served as Dedmon's assistant principal at HST.

On June 27, 2019, James Montgomery was assigned by the school board to become principal for the 2019–20 school year. Elizabeth Leonard serves as assistant principal and Forshee Blair  serves as athletic director.

Campus and facilities
Highland School was remodeled from the former Highland Junior High School. The new configuration of the hallways has three hallways, a gymnasium, and a football field. The halls are labeled A, B and C, and are quasi-sorted by career-technical academy. For example, the A hall has all of the medical classrooms, such as the dental lab located in the vicinity. There are two commons areas: Medford Commons, in which all students congregate and socialize before going to classrooms, and Times Square, where the halls meet.

Vocational academies
Each student enters the school as a member of one of the three academies. Within each academy there are various pathways available for the students, each with its own sequence of required courses.  The three academies offered are (effective for the Class of 2015):
Business, Legal Studies, & Information Sciences
Health Sciences 
Manufacturing and Engineering/Graphics

References

External links
Official Highland School of Technology Website

Public high schools in North Carolina
Schools in Gaston County, North Carolina
Magnet schools in North Carolina